Fred Everett Roberts (March 18, 1907 – January 17, 1982) was an American football player. He played college football for the University of Iowa where he was a member of Sigma Pi fraternity, vice president of the junior class, and a member of the track team.  In 1928 and 1929 he was voted All-Big Ten and in 1929 was voted a United Press All-American. In the National Football League (NFL), he played as a guard for the Portsmouth Spartans from 1930 to 1932. He appeared in 26 NFL games, 16 as a starter.

References

1907 births
1982 deaths
Iowa Hawkeyes football players
Portsmouth Spartans players
Players of American football from Iowa